Clarence Waters "Pete" Phillips, Jr. (February 1, 1925 – December 12, 2012) was an American lawyer and politician.

Born in Shelbyville, Tennessee, Phillips served in the United States Army during World War II. He then received his bachelor's degree from Vanderbilt University and his law degree from Vanderbilt University Law School. Phillips practiced law in Shelbyville, Tennessee. Phillips served in the Tennessee House of Representatives from 1973 to 2003 and was a Democrat. Phillips died in Shelbyville, Tennessee. His mother, Viola Phillips, was the first woman to serve as mayor of Loveland, Ohio, beginning in 1969.

Notes

1925 births
2012 deaths
People from Shelbyville, Tennessee
Vanderbilt University alumni
Vanderbilt University Law School alumni
Tennessee lawyers
Democratic Party members of the Tennessee House of Representatives
20th-century American lawyers